Chahab (also Romanized as Chāhāb; also known as Chāh Āb-e Gol Mīān) is a village in Abarj Rural District, Dorudzan District, Marvdasht County, Fars Province, Iran. At the 2006 census, its population was 30, in 4 families.

References 

Populated places in Marvdasht County